Collectio Avellana (the "Avellana Compilation") is a collection of 244 documents, dating from AD 367 to 553, that includes many imperial letters written to popes and others, imperial acts and papal letters and other documents that were gathered just after the mid-6th century. Many of the documents have not been preserved in any other collection. Contemporary copies have not survived: the oldest and best manuscript is in the Vatican Library, Vat. lat. 3787 (XI). This is the text that was edited by O. Guenther, Epistolae Imperatorum Pontificum Aliorum Inde ab a. CCCLXVII usque DLIII datae Avellana Quae Dicitur Collectio, in Corpus Scriptorum Ecclesiasticorum Latinorum, Vol. 35, in 2 parts (Prague/Vienna/Leipzig, 1895). 

The compiler(s) of Collectio Avellana aimed to fill the gaps of previous compilations. The author or authors must have had access to archives of the See of Rome, since they incorporated into the collection a variety of papal documents not in the Liber Pontificalis and imperial acts.

Canon law history
History of the papacy